The National Aeronautic Association of the United States (NAA) is a non-profit 501(c)(3) organization and a founding member of the Fédération Aéronautique Internationale (FAI). Founded in 1905, it is the oldest national aviation club in the United States and one of the oldest in the world, it serves as the “Aeroclub of the United States” and, by its Mission Statement it is "…dedicated to the advancement of the art, sport and science of aviation in the United States.” The NAA is headquartered at the Ronald Reagan Washington National Airport, in Washington, D.C.

History
The NAA was founded in 1905, as the Aero Club of America (ACA), by members of the Automobile Club of America.  From its inception,  ACA’s goal was to promote aviation in any way possible, as both a sport and a commercial endeavor.  In 1922, it was incorporated as the Aero Club’s successor, and continued the original group’s mission of promoting aviation. The NAA has been steeply involved with the growth of aviation in the United States almost since its beginning, to the point of being the sole issuer of pilot licenses in American until the Civil Aeronautics Act of 1926. The Chairman of the NAA is James Albaugh.  The President and Chief Executive Officer of the NAA is Greg Principato.

The NAA and the Fédération Aéronautique Internationale
In 1905, the NAA joined Germany, Spain, Belgium, the United Kingdom, Italy, Switzerland, and France to create an international aviation organization — Fédération Aéronautique Internationale —with the goal of fostering aeronautical activities worldwide. FAI is the organization responsible for establishing the rules for record-setting and competition, and also for recognizing international achievements in aeronautics and astronautics.

The NAA is the largest member of FAI and is responsible for appointing representatives to 15 major air sport and technical committees of FAI.  The NAA also represents U.S. interests in aviation at the FAI’s Annual General Conference.

Mission
The NAA has three distinct responsibilities:  The recording and certification of Aviation and Aerospace Records, the administration of Aviation Trophies and Awards, and working with Air Sports Organizations in America on the advancement of their individual sports.

Aviation and aerospace records
The NAA has certified aviation and aerospace records in the United States since 1905. Its records database counts over 8,000 record flights to include those of balloons, airships, airplanes,  (landplanes, seaplanes, amphibians, very light jets,) gliders, helicopters, autogiros, model aircraft, parachutes, human powered aircraft, spacecraft, tilt-wing/tilt-engine aircraft, hang gliders, paragliders, microlights, space models, and UAVs.  In addition, the NAA certifies a wide variety of records including altitude, time-to-climb, distance, speed, greatest payload carried, and efficiency.  As the U.S. representative to FAI, the National Aeronautic Association is the sole authority for overseeing and certifying all aviation records that take place within the United States.  On average, the NAA certifies 150 records each year. The NAA records process is directed by the NAA Contest and Records Board and managed by the NAA Director of Contest and Records, Arthur W. Greenfield. It is easy to carry out a record attempt with an ordinary plane, but there is some paperwork and verification involved.

Contest and Record Board Members (as of January 1, 2012)
Rodney M. Skaar, Chairman 
Richard A. Ionata, Vice-Chairman 
A.W. Greenfield, Secretary  
Bernard R. Gross 
Kristan R. Maynard 
Scott A. Neumann 
Brian G. Utley
Sandy Anderson
Advisory Panel
Larry E. Steenstry
David B. Higginbotham
Ardyth M. Williams

Aviation trophies and awards
The NAA acknowledges the accomplishments and achievements in aviation and aerospace through its trophies and awards.  Some of these trophies are considered to be some of the most important awards of this nature in the world.

Robert J. Collier Trophy: Established in 1910, is awarded annually "for the greatest achievement in aeronautics or astronautics in America, with respect to improving the performance, efficiency, and safety of air or space vehicles, the value of which has been thoroughly demonstrated by actual use during the preceding year."
Wright Brothers Memorial Trophy: Established in 1948, to honor the memory of Orville and Wilbur Wright, is awarded annually to a living American for "significant public service of enduring value to aviation in the United States."
Mackay Trophy: Established in 1912, is awarded annually for the "most meritorious flight of the year" by an Air Force person, persons, or organization.  The United States Air Force determines the recipient and NAA awards it.
Wesley L. McDonald Distinguished Statesman of Aviation Award: Established in 1954, is awarded annually to individuals who, for at least 25 years, has been actively identified with aeronautics and has made contributions of significant value to aeronautics.
Frank G. Brewer Trophy: Established in 1943, is awarded annually to an individual, a group of individuals, or an organization for significant contributions of enduring value to aerospace education in the United States.
Harmon Trophy for Aeronautics (Ballooning): Commonly known as simply the Harmon Trophy, was established in 1926 and is awarded annually for the most outstanding international achievement in the art and/or science of aeronautics (ballooning) for the previous year.
Henderson Trophy: Honoring Clifford W. Henderson’s legacy, was established in 1960, and is awarded annually to a living individual, group of individuals, or an organization whose vision, leadership or skill made a significant and lasting contribution to the promotion and advancement of aviation and aerospace in the United States.
Katharine Wright Trophy: Established in 1981 and named after Wilbur and Orville Wright’s sister, Katherine, is awarded annually to a woman who has contributed to the success of others, or made a personal contribution to the advancement of the art, sport and science of aviation and space flight over an extended period of time.
Public Benefit Flying Awards: Established in 1983.  A set of national awards designed to recognize the significant contributions to the Nation of volunteer-based Public Benefit Flying and the outstanding work of the individuals and organizations engaged in this humanitarian activity.   Administered jointly by NAA and the Air Care Alliance there are five categories for this award:  Distinguished Volunteer Pilot, Distinguished Volunteer, Outstanding Achievement in Advancement of Public Benefit Flying, Public Benefit Flying Teamwork Award, and Champion of Public Benefit Flying.
Stinson Trophy: Established in 1997, to honor the accomplishments of sisters Katherine Stinson and Marjorie Stinson.  It is awarded annually to a living woman for an outstanding and enduring contribution, a meritorious flight, or a singular technical development in the field of aviation, aeronautics, space or related sciences.

FAI Awards
Within the United States and its Territories, the NAA has the sole responsibility of administering awards established by the FAI.

Gold Air Medal: Awarded to individuals who have contributed greatly to the development of aeronautics by their activities, work, achievements, initiative or devotion to the cause of aviation.
Gold Space Medal: Awarded to individuals who have contributed greatly to the development of Astronautics by their activities, work, achievements, initiative or devotion to the cause of space.
Sabiha Gökçen Medal: Awarded to a woman who performs the most outstanding achievement in any air sport in the previous year.
Silver Medal: Awarded to an individual who has occupied high office in FAI or in an aeronautical organization in one of its member countries, and in the discharge of their duties have shown exceptional powers of leadership and influence, to the benefit of the whole international air sport community.
Diploma for Outstanding Airmanship: Awarded to a person or a group of persons for a feat of outstanding airmanship in sub-orbital flight during one of the previous two years and which resulted in the saving of life of others and was carried out with that objective. Anyone engaged in a routine search and/or rescue mission shall not be eligible.
Paul Tissandier Diploma.  Awarded to those who have served the cause of Aviation in general and Sporting Aviation in particular, by their work, initiative, devotion or in other ways.
Honorary Group Diploma: Awarded to groups of people (design offices, scientific bodies, aeronautical publications, etc.) that have contributed significantly to the progress of Aeronautics and Astronautics during the previous year or years.
International Aviation Art Contest: Held annually to encourage young people worldwide to demonstrate the importance of aviation through art and to motivate them to become more familiar with and participate in aeronautics, engineering and science.  The United States portion of the contest is sponsored by the National Aeronautic Association (NAA) in partnership with the National Association of State Aviation Officials (NASAO) and supported by Embry-Riddle Aeronautical University (ERAU), National Coalition for Aviation Education (NCAE) and the Federal Aviation Administration (FAA).

Air Sports In America
The NAA encourages and supports the development and growth of the sport of aviation in the United States and does so primarily through its relationship with eight Air Sport Organizations (ASOs) based in the country.  The NAA recognizes the ASOs as the official governing bodies for their respective air sports.

Air Sport Organizations
Academy of Model Aeronautics
Balloon Federation of America
International Aerobatic Club
Helicopter Club of America (Defunct)
Soaring Society of America
United States Hang Gliding and Paragliding Association
United States Parachute Association
United States Ultralight Association

NAA leadership

Officers
Chairman: Jim Albaugh
Vice Chairman: Steve Callghan, Lockheed Martin
Treasurer: Carl Johnson, Norsk Titanium
Counsel: George Carneal, Hogan Lovells
Secretary: Elizabeth Matarese
President and CEO: Greg Principato

Board of Directors

Ed Bolen, National Business Aviation Association
Christopher Brunner, United Technologies/Pratt & Whitney
Steve Champness, Aero Club of Metropolitan Atlanta
Leda Chong, Gulfstream Aerospace Corporation
John R. Dailey
Pete Dumont, Air Traffic Control Association
James Garrison, Soaring Society of America
Arthur W. Greenfield Jr., NAA, Contest & Records Director
Angela Gittens, Airport Council International
Rich Hanson, Academy of Model Aeronautics
Duane Hawkins, Spirit Aerosystems
Margaret Jenny
TC Jones, Northrop Grumman Corporation
Tim Keating Boeing
Leo Knaapen, Bombardier Aerospace
Dick Koenig, Commemorative Air force
Dr. John S. Langford, Aurora Flight Sciences
Peter Lengyel, Safran
Dr. Samantha Magill, American Institute of Aeronautics and Astronautics
Clay McConnell, Airbus
Margaret McKeough, Aero Club of Washington
Mary Miller, BBA Aviation
Mary Claire Murphy, Textron Aviation
Martin Palmaz, US Hang Gliding and Paragliding Association
Ken Panos Aerojet
Eric Pierce, Lockheed Martin
Pat Prentiss, The Ninety-Nines, Inc.
Peter Prowitt, GE Aviation
Mark Rector, Honda Aircraft Company
Skip Ringo, The Ringo Group
Darryl Roberson, Rolls-Royce, North America
Jean Rosanvallon, Dassault Falcon
John Stammreich, Aero Club of Southern California
Bob Stangarone, Stangarone and Associates
Alyssa Ten Eyck, Embraer
Anthony L. Velocci, Aviation Week & Space Technology Magazine (Retired)
FlightSafety International
Rockwell Collins

Staff
Art Greenfield, Director of Contests and Records
Stephanie Berry, Director for Awards and Events
Katherine McCormick, Manager, Office Services

NAA membership
NAA has five groups of members:  Corporate, Air Sport, Affiliate, Aero Clubs, and Individuals.

Corporate members

 Aerojet
 Airbus Group
 Aurora Flight Sciences
 Bombardier
 The Boeing Company
 Embraer
 GE Aviation
 Gulfstream
 Honda Aircraft Company
 Jeppesen
 Lockheed Martin Corporation
 Northrop Grumman Corporation
 Rockwell Collins, Inc
 Rolls-Royce North America
 Safe Flight Instrument Corporation
 Signature Flight Support
 Spirit AeroSystems
 Textron Aviation
 United Technologies Corporation

Air Sport members
 Academy of Model Aeronautics
 Balloon Federation of America
 International Aerobatic Club
 Soaring Society of America
 United States Hang Gliding and Paragliding Association
 United States Parachute Association
 United States Ultralight Association

Affiliate members
 Air Line Pilots Association
Air Traffic Control Association
Aerospace Industries Association
 Aircraft Owners and Pilots Association
 Airlines For America
Airports Council International - NA
 American Institute of Aeronautics and Astronautics
AUVSI
Cargo Airline Association
Experimental Aircraft Association
General Aviation Manufacturers Association
Helicopter Association International
National Air Traffic Controllers Association
 National Air Transport Association
 National Association of State Aviation Officials
 National Business Aviation Association
Radio Technical Commission for Aeronautics
 The Ninety-Nines

Aero Club members
 Aero Club of Metropolitan Atlanta
 Aero Club of New England
 Aero Club of Northern California
 Aero Club of Southern California
 Aero Club of Washington
 Wichita Aeroclub

Individual members
As of December 31, 2014 NAA has 1,029 individual members.

NAA Luncheon Program
The NAA Luncheon Program brings together leaders in the aviation and aerospace industry with professionals from around the Metropolitan Washington, DC region.  Speakers from the highest levels of government, industry, and associations have addressed important issues related to the Department of Defense, the military services, and Aerospace Industry Affairs.

The NAA Luncheon Program is directed by the NAA National Aviation Awards and Events Committee.

References

External links
 National Aeronautic Association

Aviation organizations based in the United States
Aeronautics
Aviation competitions and awards
Aviation organizations